The Olympic Plaza is an urban park and gathering place in downtown Calgary, Alberta, Canada. Located around Macleod Trail and 7 Avenue South, it was created as the venue for the medal ceremonies at the 1988 Winter Olympics.  In 2004, over 30,000 people packed the plaza to celebrate the Calgary Flames' run to the 2004 Stanley Cup Finals.

Olympic Plaza serves as a meeting place, and an outdoor event area, hosting concerts and festivals.  In the winter, it is used as a public ice skating area.  The plaza is accessible by Calgary's CTrain system at the  City Hall station.

External links
Olympic Plaza photos 

Tourist attractions in Calgary